Karl Ziegler Morgan (September 27, 1907 – June 8, 1999), was an American physicist who was one of the founders of the field of radiation health physics. He was director of health physics at Oak Ridge National Laboratory from the time in the Manhattan Project late 1940s until his retirement in 1972.

Late in life, in 1982 he became a critic of nuclear power and nuclear weapons production .

Early life and education 
Born in Enochville, North Carolina in 1907, Karl Morgan attended Lenoir-Rhyne College (now University) as a freshman and sophomore and then transferred to the University of North Carolina, where he graduated with bachelor's and master's degrees in physics and mathematics. He continued graduate study in physics at Duke University, where he received a PhD degree in 1934 for research into cosmic radiation.

Career
He began an academic career as a faculty member at Lenoir Rhyne College, but in 1943 was recruited to work in the secret project to develop an atomic bomb.

Initially at the University of Chicago Metallurgical Laboratory and later in Oak Ridge, Morgan joined a small group of physicists who were interested in the health effects of radiation.

Morgan became director of health physics at Oak Ridge National Laboratory (ORNL), serving from the late 1940s until his retirement in 1972. 
In 1955 he became the first president of the Health Physics Society, and was editor of the journal Health Physics from 1955 to 1977. 

After his retirement from ORNL in 1972, he joined the faculty of Georgia Institute of Technology as professor of nuclear energy in the school of nuclear engineering, retiring from that position in 1982. Thereafter he became a consulting professor at Appalachian State University.

After decades as a "pillar of the nuclear establishment", Morgan had a "change of heart" about nuclear weapons production and nuclear power. He began to offer court testimony which was friendly to people who said they had been harmed by nuclear weapons and the nuclear power industry. In October 1982, he testified in a lawsuit brought by nearly 1,200 people who accused the government of negligence in atomic weapons testing at the Nevada Test Site in the 1950s, which they said had caused leukemia and other cancers. Morgan, then 75 years old, testified that radiation protection measures in the tests were substandard.

Morgan also testified on behalf of Navajo uranium miners and their survivors, saying government officials had known about mine radiation dangers but had not protected the miners. He also testified in the case of Karen Silkwood against Kerr-McGee.

Morgan died in Oak Ridge, Tennessee, on June 8, 1999, apparently from a ruptured aortic aneurysm.

Morgan's autobiography, The Angry Genie: One Man's Walk Through the Nuclear Age was published in 1999 by the University of Oklahoma Press.

Reception
John Cameron, a developer of a dosimeter in the 1960s, criticized Morgan's autobiography. He wrote a posthumous critique, called the book otherwise interesting for its historical detailing of the Manhattan Project's health physics evolution and criticized what he called generally "flawed" anti-nuclear stance, an exaggeration of the Linear no-threshold model.

See also
Anti-nuclear movement in the United States
List of nuclear whistleblowers
Nuclear safety

References

External links
 Human Radiation Studies: Remembering the Early Years; Oral History of Health Physicist Karl Z. Morgan, Ph.D., conducted January 7, 1995, DOE/EH-0475, U.S. Department of Energy

1908 births
1999 deaths
People from Enochville, North Carolina
People associated with nuclear power
Oak Ridge National Laboratory people
Manhattan Project people
People from Oak Ridge, Tennessee
Health physicists
Health Physics Society
Fellows of the American Physical Society